The 2019 Iraqi Super Cup was the 9th edition of the Iraqi Super Cup. The match was contested between the Baghdad rivals, Al-Shorta and Al-Zawraa, at Al-Kut Olympic Stadium in Kut. It was played on 14 September 2019 as a curtain-raiser to the 2019–20 season. Al-Shorta made their 2nd appearance in the Super Cup while Al-Zawraa extended their record to 7 appearances. Al-Shorta won the cup on penalties for the club's first Super Cup title.

Match

Details

References

External links
 Iraq Football Association

Football competitions in Iraq
Iraqi Super Cup
Iraq
September 2019 sports events in Iraq
2019–20 in Iraqi football